Warren Hackett (born 16 December 1971) is a former professional footballer who played as an international for Saint Lucia. A defender, primarily a left-back, he began his career with Tottenham Hotspur and was part of the 1990 winning FA Youth Cup side, but was released without breaking into the first-team, having spells with Leyton Orient, Doncaster, Mansfield and Barnet.

After retirement from the football league due to injury, Hackett played for two seasons in non-League football before going into coaching where he was assistant manager at Waltham Forest, Fisher Athletic and Erith & Belvedere.

He then moved to Toronto, Ontario, Canada to further his coaching career and worked for Glen Shields Soccer Club as an Academy Director. He returned to England and was the Academy manager / Centre Of Excellence Manager at Dagenham & Redbridge. Hackett was promoted to first-team assistant manager, along with Darren Currie, in February 2013 when his former Leyton Orient team-mate Wayne Burnett took over as manager of Dagenham.

In December 2015, following the sacking of manager Burnett, Hackett and Currie became caretaker managers of Dagenham & Redbridge losing their first game in charge, on 26 December, 3–0 at home to Cambridge United.

Managerial statistics

References

External links

1971 births
Living people
English people of Saint Lucian descent
English footballers
People with acquired Saint Lucian citizenship
Saint Lucian footballers
Leyton Orient F.C. players
Doncaster Rovers F.C. players
Mansfield Town F.C. players
Barnet F.C. players
Grays Athletic F.C. players
Saint Lucia international footballers
Harrow Borough F.C. players
Redbridge F.C. players
Chesham United F.C. players
Waltham Forest F.C. players
Fisher Athletic F.C. players
Erith & Belvedere F.C. players
Association football defenders
Footballers from Plaistow, Newham
English Football League players
Saint Lucian football managers
English Football League managers
Dagenham & Redbridge F.C. managers